Ivars Hirss (1931–1989) was a Latvian-born American painter.

Life and work
Hirss was born in Riga, into an extremely wealthy Latvian family.  Contrary to his father's wishes that he become a businessman, Hirss pursued a career in art.  He eventually moved to San Francisco, where, by the early 1960s he had made a name for himself in graphics, as well as within the greater San Francisco art community.  He had several successful exhibits, including one at the Triangle Gallery (San Francisco) in 1962 and another in 1967 at the San Francisco Museum of Modern Art.  His work often included a bright primary color upon which other colors were then superimposed.  It also often included Latvian decoration or ornament.  Hirss died in 1989 from complications related to alcoholism.  With the revival of modernist aesthetics, Hirss' art has received renewed interest from scholars.

Exhibitions
1962 Thesis (M.F.A.)--California College of Arts and Crafts "The serigraphs of Ivars Hirss", San Francisco, CA
1967 January 17-February 12, "Serigraphs by Rolf Eiselin and Ivars Hirss: San Francisco Museum of Art. CA
1971 January 15-February 28, "San Francisco Art Institute centennial exhibition", San Francisco CA

Selected major collections
The Janet Turner Print Museum at California State University, Chico. CA
(in others as well as many private collections)

List of works
Untitled, 1962, Serigraph / color Collection of The Janet Turner Print Museum at California State University, Chico CA.
My Window Facing East,	Serigraph/color, Collection of The Janet Turner Print Museum at California State University, Chico CA.

References

Additional reference
American artist, Vol 28, P 63 1964
S.F. Art Clippings v.4: 122 - exhibit

External links
San Francisco Public Library, Artists File : Hirss, Ivars (1931- ) b. Riga, Latvia S.F
The Janet Turner Print Museum at California State University, Chico. Collection: Ivars Hirss.

1931 births
1989 deaths
Artists from Riga
Latvian painters
American contemporary painters
Modern artists
20th-century American painters
American male painters
Painters from California
Soviet emigrants to the United States
20th-century American male artists